The 2010 FIBA Stanković Continental Champions' Cup, or 2010 FIBA Mini World Cup, officially called Dongfeng Yueda KIA Stanković Continental Cup 2010, was the 6th annual FIBA Stanković Continental Champions' Cup tournament. It was held in Liuzhou, China, from July 28 to August 1.

Participating teams

Game results
All 4 teams played a round-robin tournament first. The top 2 teams advanced to final while the other 2 teams fought for the 3rd place.

Round-robin

All time UTC+8.

Third-place Playoff

Final

Final standings

External links

2010
2010–11 in Chinese basketball
2010–11 in Iranian basketball
2010–11 in Slovenian basketball
2010–11 in Australian basketball